Acarology  (from Ancient Greek /, a type of mite; and) is the study of mites and ticks, the animals in the order Acarina. It is a subfield of arachnology, a subdiscipline of the field of zoology. A zoologist specializing in acarology is called an acarologist. Acarologists may also be parasitologists because many members of Acarina are parasitic. Many acarologists are studying around the world both professionally and as amateurs. The discipline is a developing science and long-awaited research has been provided for it in more recent history.

Acarological organisations
 Laboratory of Medical Acarology, Academy of Sciences of the Czech Republic
 Tick Research Laboratory, University of Rhode Island
 Tick Research Lab at Texas A&M University

Acarological societies

International
 International Congress of Acarology
 Societe Internationale des Acarologues de Langue Francaise
 Systematic and Applied Acarology Society

Regional
 Acarology Society of America
 Acarological Society of Iran
 Acarological Society of Japan
 African Acarology Association
 Egyptian Society of Acarology
 European Association of Acarologists

Notable acarologists
 Mercedes Delfinado
 Natalia Aleksandrovna Filippova
 Harry Hoogstraal
 Pat Nuttall
 Maria V. Pospelova-Shtrom
 Ronald Vernon Southcott
 Jane Brotherton Walker
 Aleksei Zachvatkin

Journals
The leading scientific journals for acarology include: 
 Acarologia
 Acarines
 Experimental and Applied Acarology 
 International Journal of Acarology
 Systematic & Applied Acarology
 Ticks and Tick-borne Diseases
 Persian Journal of Acarology

See also
 Parasitology
 List of words ending in ology

References

Further reading
 Experimental and Applied Acarology,  (electronic),  (paper), Springer

External links 
 
 

Acari and humans
Subfields of arthropodology
Arachnology